The 1939 Washington State Cougars football team was an American football team that represented Washington State College in the Pacific Coast Conference (PCC) during the 1939 college football season. Fourteenth-year head coach Babe Hollingbery led the team to a 4–5 record (3–5 in PCC, sixth); they were outscored 138 to 67, held scoreless three times, and recorded two shutouts.

The Cougars' three home games were played on campus at Rogers Field in Pullman.

Longtime assistant coach Karl Schlademan moved on to Michigan State after this season.

Schedule

References

External links
 Game program: Gonzaga at WSC – September 23, 1939
 Game program: Washington at WSC – October 14, 1939
 Game program: Idaho at WSC – November 11, 1939

Washington State
Washington State Cougars football seasons
Washington State Cougars football